Naiad Press (1973–2003) was an American publishing company, one of the first dedicated to lesbian literature. At its closing it was the oldest and largest lesbian/feminist publisher in the world.

History
Naiad Press was founded by partners Barbara Grier and Donna McBride in January 1973, along with Anyda Marchant and Muriel Crawford. It was devoted exclusively to lesbian literature. The company began both in Kansas City, Missouri, home of Grier and McBride and Rehoboth Beach, DE, home of Marchant and Crawford. The business began with $2000, provided by the author of the Press's first work, The Latecomer by Sarah Aldridge, the pen name of lawyer Anyda Marchant, and her partner Muriel Crawford.

In 1973, there were few bookstores which would carry such overtly lesbian materials, so Naiad Press relied heavily on mail order in order to market and sell books.  Naiad benefitted from its use of the 3800-member mailing list of The Ladder, a prominent and recently defunct lesbian newsletter published by the Daughters of Bilitis. "Naiad's commitment to the publication of lesbian material included the use of its profits from one book to produce the next".

In addition to original writings, Naiad published out-of-print lesbian fiction, such as novels of Ann Bannon, Jane Rule and Gale Wilhelm and acquired rights and brought back into print poetry by Gertrude Stein and translations of poetry by Renee Vivien. Early book covers were designed by Tee Corinne. Naiad was credited with playing "a crucial role in bringing lesbian mysteries into prominence in the 1980s" by publishing award-winning series featuring detectives Kate Delafield, Carol Ashton, Caitlin Reece, Virginia Kelley and others. 

Authors Sarah Schulman and Patrick Califia were first published by Naiad Press. Its genre fiction authors included prolific and award-winning writers such as Katherine V. Forrest, Claire McNab and Karin Kallmaker. 

Naiad achieved national prominence in 1985 with its publication of Lesbian Nuns: Breaking Silence, for which it reportedly paid Rosemary Keefe Curb and Nancy Manahan $500,000. The book was banned in Boston. The press also published other nonfiction work, such as The Lesbian Periodical Index, The Lesbian in Literature, and Staying Power: Long-Term Lesbian Couples.

In 2002, Grier and McBride received the Pioneer Award from the Lambda Literary Foundation. On their retirement in 2003, Grier and McBride sold their current stock to Bella Books. Many Naiad Press authors transferred their contracts to Bella Books.

The Naiad Press Collection at Gay and Lesbian Center of the SFPL
In 1992, Grier established the Naiad Press Collection at the James C. Hormel Gay and Lesbian Center of the San Francisco Public Library, completing delivery of their massive collection of memorabilia, lesbian and gay literature, including many classic lesbian pulp fiction titles in 1998. Correspondence in the collection includes exchanges with contracted authors as well as other literary luminaries and influences such as Dorothy Allison, Rita Mae Brown, Nancy Berreano of publishing houses Crossing and Firebrand, Andrea Dworkin, Audre Lorde, Sherry Thomas of Old Wives Tales feminist bookstore and Spinsters Ink, and background material on the establishment of the Women in Print Conferences which began in 1976 and are widely credited with creating the Feminist Bookstore Network. 

Clothing, banners, posters, T-shirts and scrapbooks comprise the memorabilia in the collection. Extensive audio recordings made of interviews and news programs over the press's history are also in the collection. The San Francisco Public Library History Center holds the considerable collection of archival photographs of lesbian and gay literary figures.

Notable authors

 Sarah Aldridge
 Ann Bannon
 Lyn Denison
 Katherine V. Forrest
 Camarin Grae
 Barbara Grier
 Patricia Highsmith
 Karin Kallmaker
 Lee Lynch
 Claire McNab
 Isabel Miller
 Jane Rule
 Valerie Taylor
 Gale Wilhelm

Footnotes

Further reading
 Rapp, Linda. "Grier, Barbara" in glbtq.com: An Encyclopedia of Gay, Lesbian, Bisexual, Transgender, and Queer Culture.
 Zimmerman, Bonnie. Safe Sea of Women: Lesbian Literature 1969-1989, Beacon Press, 1990, .

External links
 
 Catalog of The Naiad Press Collection, James C. Hormel Gay and Lesbian Center, San Francisco Public Library
 LGBT Oral History Project of North Florida interviews, Reichelt Oral History Collection, HPUA-2015-00R, Special Collections & Archives, Florida State University Libraries, Tallahassee, Florida. 

Defunct book publishing companies of the United States
Lambda Literary Award winners
Lesbian fiction
LGBT book publishing companies
Publishing companies established in 1973
Small press publishing companies
Feminist book publishing companies